Wong Shoon Keat (born 30 April 1957) is a Singaporean former badminton player. He is a former SEA Games gold medalist and a ten-time national champion in two disciplines.

Career 
Wong won Singapore's first-ever badminton gold at the 1983 Southeast Asian Games and to date, is Singapore’s only title winner in the men's singles event. That year, he pulled off an upset over reigning world champion Icuk Sugiarto of Indonesia in the team event, and beat another Indonesian player, Hastomo Arbi in the men's singles final. Wong is also a four-time national champion in the men's singles and a six-time national champion in the men's doubles.

Wong is an accredited coach within the Singapore National Registry of Coaches (NROC). He is also the founder of Keat Youngster Academy, providing coaching services to young aspiring players in Singapore.

Personal life 
Wong's wife, Irene Lee is a former national champion. They have four sons together, namely Shawn, Derek, Jamie and Jason. Both Derek and Jason, are also badminton players for Singapore.

Awards 
Wong received the 1984 Meritorious Award from the Singapore National Olympic Committee.

Achievements

References 

1957 births
Living people
Singaporean male badminton players
Competitors at the 1979 Southeast Asian Games
Competitors at the 1983 Southeast Asian Games
Competitors at the 1985 Southeast Asian Games
Southeast Asian Games gold medalists for Singapore
Southeast Asian Games bronze medalists for Singapore
Southeast Asian Games medalists in badminton